Governor Wells may refer to:

Heber Manning Wells, 1st Governor of Utah
Henry H. Wells, Provisional Governor of Virginia from 1868 to 1869
Humphrey Wells, Governor of Georgia for two days in 1780
James Madison Wells, 20th Governor of Louisiana
Samuel Wells, 25th Governor of Maine

See also
Thomas Welles (1590–1660), 17th and 20th Governor of the Colony of Connecticut